Faeculoides is a genus of moths of the family Erebidae first described by Michael Fibiger in 2008. Despite containing some long-known species, the genus' distinctness was noted only in 2008.

Initially and briefly, the genus was known as Faecula. That name was earlier given to a genus of cylindrical bark beetles, and the moth genus was soon renamed.

Species
Three species are presently placed here:
 Faeculoides bifusa
 Faeculoides plumbifusa
 Faeculoides leucopis

References

Micronoctuini
Noctuoidea genera